Kathleen A. Krosnicki is a former member of the Wisconsin State Assembly.

Biography
Krosnicki was born on November 5, 1950, in Crandon, Wisconsin. She graduated from the University of Wisconsin–Milwaukee and is married with one child.

Career
Krosnicki was elected to the Assembly in 1992. She is a Republican.

References

People from Crandon, Wisconsin
Republican Party members of the Wisconsin State Assembly
Women state legislators in Wisconsin
University of Wisconsin–Milwaukee alumni
1950 births
Living people
21st-century American women